Yadkin Valley is an unincorporated community in Caldwell County, North Carolina, United States.

Two sites in Yadkin Valley, The Fountain and the Walter James Lenoir House, are listed on the National Register of Historic Places.

References

Unincorporated communities in Caldwell County, North Carolina
Unincorporated communities in North Carolina